Brian Fox Haig (born March 15, 1953) is an American thriller author and Fox News military analyst.

Early life and family
Haig's father was former U.S. Secretary of State Alexander Haig (1924–2010); his mother is Patricia (née Fox). He has a brother Alexander and a sister Barbara.

Military life
Haig graduated from West Point in 1975 and was commissioned an infantry lieutenant. He served as a platoon leader and company executive officer in Germany, three years as an infantry company commander at Fort Carson, Colorado, before he was selected as an intern at the Organization of the Joint Chiefs of Staff, where he worked in the Current Operations Directorate on the Lebanon peacekeeping operation. After graduating from Harvard with a master's degree and a specialty in military strategy, he worked for three years as a global strategist on the Army staff, where he was responsible for helping formulate the regional war plan for Southwest Asia and the global war plans against the Soviet Union. He spent three years as the Special Assistant to the Commander-in-Chief of the United Nations Command and Combined Forces Command in Seoul. Haig ended his military career as the special assistant to the Chairman of the Joint Chiefs of Staff – John M. Shalikashvili, where his duties lay with the preparation of all speeches, briefings, public statements, and congressional testimonies. He retired from active duty as a lieutenant colonel in 1997.

After the military
Haig retired into civilian life in 1997 to become a director and later president of Erickson Air-Crane and then spent a year as president of International Business Communications. He has written articles for The New York Times, USA Today and Vanity Fair. He is now a full-time author, and works as a Fox News military contributor.

He has a Bachelor of Science from the United States Military Academy, a master's in public administration from Harvard, and a master's in government from Georgetown University. His military awards include Airborne wings and the Ranger tab, two Legions of Merit, and the Distinguished Service Medal.

Sean Drummond books

Many of his books involve special forces officer turned Army JAG lawyer Major/Lieutenant Colonel Sean Drummond:
Secret Sanction, Warner Books (2001), 
Mortal Allies, Warner Books (2002), 
The Kingmaker, Warner Books (2003), 
Private Sector, Warner Books (2004), 
The President's Assassin, Warner Books (2005), 
Man In The Middle, Warner Books (2007), 
The Night Crew, Thomas & Mercer (2015),

Other books
The Hunted, Grand Central Publishing (2009), 
The Capitol Game, Grand Central Publishing (2010),

References

External links
Brian Haig homepage

1953 births
Living people
American thriller writers
Place of birth missing (living people)
United States Army colonels
United States Military Academy alumni
Recipients of the Legion of Merit
Harvard Kennedy School alumni
American male novelists
21st-century American novelists
Georgetown University alumni
21st-century American male writers